Sutanto Tan (born 4 May 1994) is an Indonesian professional footballer who plays as a midfielder for Liga 1 club Persis Solo.

Club career

Hougang United
In 2014, Sutanto joined S.League club Hougang United FC. Where, since he was 20 years old, he played in the club as a striker. In September 2014, Sutanto made his debut in the 2014 S.League against Harimau Muda B. In that match, Sutanto replaced Diego Gama in the 76th minute. And in a friendly match against FC Gifu, Sutanto scored the opening goal in 4–0 won over FC Gifu.

Mitra Kukar
In 2016, he joined Mitra Kukar in the 2016 Bhayangkara Cup tournament.

Persija Jakarta
After short and unsuccessful stints with Bali United and Mitra Kukar, Sutanto joined Persija Jakarta for the 2016 Torabika Soccer Championship A (TSC). He made the starting lineup for the opening match against Persipura Jayapura in Jayapura, and played the full 90 minutes. Deemed under-performed on the match with ended 1-1, then coach, Paulo Camargo, decided to sideline Sutanto for the following matches.

Bali United
On December 12, 2017, he signed a one-year contract with Bali United. On 16 April 2018, Sutanto made his league debut for the club in a match against Persela Lamongan, coming on as a substitute for Miloš Krkotić in the 88th minute. During his spell in Bali United, Sutanto joined a trial programme in Sweden for Dalkurd FF, but failed to impress the coaches. He returned to Bali United on January 27, 2019. During his career at Bali United, he only made 7 league appearances

PSIM Yogyakarta 
Sutanto joined PSIM Yogyakarta on August 18, 2019, as a free transfer during the second Indonesian transfer window.

PSMS Medan
In 2020, Sutanto signed a one-year contract with Indonesian Liga 2 club PSMS Medan. This season was suspended on 27 March 2020 due to the COVID-19 pandemic. The season was abandoned and was declared void on 20 January 2021.

PSM Makassar
In 2021, Sutanto signed a one-year contract with PSM Makassar for 2021 Menpora Cup and 2021–22 Liga 1. He made his league debut on 5 September by starting in a 1–1 draw against Arema at the Pakansari Stadium, Cibinong, and he also give assists a goal by Ilham Armaiyn in 23rd minutes. He played the full 90 minutes in a 1–1 draw against Madura United on 12 September. On 2 December, Sutanto scored his first league goal for PSM in a 1–1 draw over Persela Lamongan, where he scored from a penalty kick, it was his first goal in an official competition. He had previously never scored a single goal during his career as a footballer.

Persis Solo
Sutanto was signed for Persis Solo to play in Liga 1 in the 2022–23 season. He made his league debut on 31 July 2022 in a match against Persija Jakarta at the Patriot Candrabhaga Stadium, Bekasi. On 6 December, Sutanto scored his first league goal for Persis Solo, the opening goal against RANS Nusantara in a 6–1 win in the Liga 1.

References

External links
Sutanto Tan at Soccerway

1994 births
Living people
People from Pekanbaru
Indonesian sportspeople of Chinese descent
Indonesian footballers
Indonesian expatriate footballers
Expatriate footballers in Singapore
Expatriate sportspeople in Singapore
Singapore Premier League players
Liga 1 (Indonesia) players
Liga 2 (Indonesia) players
Hougang United FC players
Mitra Kukar players
Persija Jakarta players
Bali United F.C. players
PSIM Yogyakarta players
PSMS Medan players
PSM Makassar players
Persis Solo players
Indonesia youth international footballers
Association football midfielders
Sportspeople from Riau